Time in Eritrea is in a single time zone, officially denoted as East Africa Time (EAT; UTC+03:00). Eritrea has never observed daylight saving time. It has consistently observed EAT since its independence in 1993.

IANA time zone database 
In the IANA time zone database, Eritrea is given one zone in the file zone.tab – Africa/Asmara. "ER" refers to the country's ISO 3166-1 alpha-2 country code. Data for Eritrea directly from zone.tab of the IANA time zone database; columns marked with * are the columns from zone.tab itself:

See also 
List of time zones by country
List of UTC time offsets
Time in Ethiopia

References

External links 
Current time in Eritrea at Time.is
Time in Eritrea at TimeAndDate.com

Time in Eritrea